Elting Memorial Library is the public library that serves the residents of the village and town of New Paltz, New York. It is located at 93 Main Street (also NY 32 and 299) in the village's downtown area.  In addition to a collection typical of most college town libraries, Elting Memorial Library houses the Haviland-Heidgerd Historical Collection, the non-circulating genealogical and historical research collection, with a focus on the history of the Town and Village of New Paltz. This collection features "house books" that detail the history of local homes and buildings, including historic structures. The library gained notoriety in 2007 for a videotaped ghost visit that became the most popular online video about New Paltz.

History
Originally called the New Paltz Free Library, the library was founded by the New Paltz Study Club in 1909, and outgrew its space on lower Main Street by 1919.  Native son and summer resident Philip Lefevre Elting purchased the "Old Elting Homestead" for library use in 1920.

The old stone house was originally called the Solomon Eltinge House after its original owner and builder, and was part of the expansion of New Paltz from its original settlement on Huguenot Street.  One of the earliest buildings on Main Street, it was erected around the same time as the Village of New Paltz was incorporated, and its location made it convenient for it to become a library in 1920.

The original building, considered the "final gasp of stone house architecture" in the area, had new wings added on in 1962 and 1978, and was expanded again in 2006 (during which the bulk of the library's collection was relocated to temporary storage facilities). This expansion cost approximately $2.5 million, and much of the library's collection and its main circulation desk are housed in this most recent addition. It has been on the National Register of Historic Places since 2004.  It is located within the New Paltz Downtown Historic District.

Services and structure
As of 2019, the library serves some 14,000 area residents, circulating approximately 101,000 items a year. A member of the Mid-Hudson Library System, it also offers a range of programming including speakers, story times, reading nights, free movies and area employment and tourism information.  The library is also a key member of the One Book, One New Paltz program.
Beginning in 2010, the Elting library began receiving the bulk of its funding through a substantial increase from the Town of New Paltz taxes as a result of referendum on the issue.

The Haviland Heidgerd Historical Collection
The library's historic collection houses a significant collection of materials relevant to the local area.  According to the library's own web site, "It is considered to be one of the best local history collections in the Hudson Valley and is home to a wealth of primary, one-of-a-kind, local history documents. Residents, descendants of New Paltz’s founding families, visitors, scholars, and students use the collection’s resources to research area history and trace family and genealogical roots."  The collection includes over 10,000 newspapers, photographs, periodicals, and yearbooks that date back as far as 1860.

Governance
Elting Memorial Library is an Association Library. The library is governed by a board of directors which includes four officers and eight additional members.  The board oversees a library director and staff.

As of 2021, the president of the board is Robert Miller  and the director of the library is Gillian Murphy.

Elting Library ghost
A week before Halloween in 2007, a possible haunting was discovered. A librarian opening the building in the morning found the door had been left ajar. Review of security tapes revealed a 30-second stretch at approximately 3:30 in the morning of what staffers later described as anomaly moving across the room toward the door, eventually disappearing through the east wall. The library staff inspected the camera but could not find any technical problems that could easily explain the blurry image, which they described in published reports as an anomaly, spider, shadow, or dust mote.

As the security tape showed an area within the original Solomon Eltinge House, curious librarians researched its history in the library's Haviland-Heidgerd Historical Collection.  Two documented deaths had occurred in the house, in 1899 and 1908.  The ghost video was uploaded to YouTube on March 21, 2008, and has garnered more than 300,000 views as of October of that year - approximately fifty times the population of the village in 2000.

The timing of the alleged haunting furthered interest in the incident, although it was not widely known until several months after the door was found ajar.

See also

 Mid-Hudson Library System

References

Public libraries in New York (state)
Buildings and structures in Ulster County, New York
Libraries on the National Register of Historic Places in New York (state)
National Register of Historic Places in Ulster County, New York
New Paltz, New York
Reportedly haunted locations in New York (state)